

Events

References

External links
IMB 2007 Interactive Piracy Map
U.S. Navy Said to Chase Pirates Off Somalia, The New York Times, 2007.

Piracy
Piracy by year